The troubled teen industry is a term used to refer to a broad range of youth residential programs aimed at struggling teenagers. The term encompasses various facilities and programs, including youth residential treatment centers, wilderness programs, boot camps, and therapeutic boarding schools.

The industry is a multi-billion dollar industry that claims to help or fix troubled teenagers through various practices. Troubled teen facilities are privately run and largely unregulated. They accept young people who are considered to have struggles with learning disabilities, emotional regulation, mental illness, and substance abuse. Young people may be labeled as "troubled teens", delinquents, or other language on their websites. The majority encounter the industry through their parents, and some can remain in the industry until they turn 18. Alternatively, these sites can claim to help other self-destructive behaviors, in order to widen their reach. Sometimes, these therapies are used as a punishment for contravening family expectations.

The troubled teen industry has encountered many scandals due to child abuse, institutional corruption, and deaths. Furthermore, many institutions offer youth transportation through teen escort companies, in which minors are transported to these facilities against their will, but with their parents' written consent. It is a service offered in the United States and elsewhere, and a practice that has been criticized on ethical and legal grounds as being akin to kidnapping. Some may not even realize their parents signed off on it until days afterward. Clients have reported being ambushed in their own beds at home, or tricked into believing they're going elsewhere.

History 

The troubled teen industry has a precursor in the drug rehabilitation program called Synanon, founded in 1958 by Charles Dederich. By the late 1970s, Synanon had developed into a cult and adopted a resolution proclaiming the Synanon Religion, with Dederich as the highest spiritual authority. Synanon rejected the use of medication for drug rehabilitation, and instead relied on the "Synanon Game", group sessions of attack therapy where members were encouraged to criticize and humiliate each other. Synanon disbanded in 1991, after its tax-exempt status was revoked by the IRS and it was bankrupted by having to pay US$17 million in back taxes.

Synanon popularized "tough love" attack therapy, and the idea that confrontation and verbal condemnation could cure adolescent misbehavior. Its techniques influenced human potential self-help organizations such as est and Lifespring. Synanon-style therapy was also used in Straight Incorporated and The Seed, two drug rehabilitation programs for youth.

Former Synanon member Mel Wasserman founded CEDU Educational Services in 1967, a company which operated within the troubled teens industry. CEDU owned several for-profit therapeutic boarding schools, group homes, and behavior modification programs. The techniques used by CEDU schools were derived from Synanon's; for example, long, confrontational large-group sessions called "Propheets" took cues from the Synanon Game. CEDU went out of business in 2005, amid lawsuits and state regulatory crackdowns.

Joseph "Joe" Ricci, dropout from a direct Synanon-descendent program, founded a therapeutic boarding school called Élan School in 1970. Élan closed down in 2011 amid persistent allegations of abuse.

Synanon's techniques also inspired the World Wide Association of Specialty Programs (WWASP), an umbrella organization of facilities meant for rehabilitating troubled teenagers. WWASP is no longer in business, due to widespread allegations of physical and psychological abuse.

Timeline 

 1967: CEDU High School is founded by Mel Wasserman, a former Synanon member, in Running Springs, CA. 
 May 30, 1970: The Élan School is founded by Joe Ricci, a former resident of Daytop Village, in Naples, ME. 
 February 16, 1982: Nancy Reagan vists Straight Inc. in Florida.
 May 26, 1983: A federal jury awards a Straight Inc. patient $220,000 after finding said patient to have been falsely imprisoned by the foundation.
 November 11, 1985: Princess Diana and Nancy Reagan visit Straight Inc.
 1987: Scientology troubled teen program called Mace Kingsley Ranch School opens in California
 January 15, 1995: Aaron Bacon dies from acute peritonitis whilst attending the North Star Wilderness program in Utah.
 December 21, 1996: Craig Fisher is sentenced over his role in Aaron Bacon's death.
 July 15, 2002: Ian August dies while attending the Skyline Journey wilderness program in Utah.
 December 25, 2002: A 17-year-old girl named Kiley Jaquays falls to her death while visiting the Bloomington Caves in Utah with her residential treatment center Integrity House.
 May 23, 2003: Costa Rican government officials shut down the Academy at Dundee Ranch, a behavior modification program run by a US-based company called World Wide Association of Specialty Programs and Schools.
 February 8, 2004: 16-year-old Daniel Yeun goes missing from CEDU High School in the state of California.
 2006: Yang Yongxin establishes an "Internet-addiction camp" inside the Fourth Hospital of Linyi in China and begins practicing electroconvulsive therapy.
 February 8, 2013: The hacking collective group Anonymous launches a campaign against the troubled teen industry calling it #OpTTIabuse.
 July 10, 2019: Red Rock Canyon School in Utah closes after a riot breaks out in April 2019.
 August 31, 2022: Agape Baptist Academy is served an indictment for transporting California teenager and violating protection order.
 January 11, 2023: Agape Baptist Academy announces plans for permanent closure.

Media 
 Children of Darkness, a 1983 documentary on the Élan School
 Not My Kid, a 1985 TV movie based on the Straight Inc program
 Without Consent a 1994 TV movie about teenager sent to abusive Residential treatment center were clients are drugged and abused.
 Locked in Paradise, a television program on the troubled teen program called Tranquility Bay, aired in December 2004
 Brat Camp, a reality TV show first aired in 2005, where teenagers are sent to wilderness therapy programs in the states of Utah, Idaho, and Arizona
 Boot Camp, a 2008 film based on the WWASP program Paradise Cove, located in Samoa
 Kidnapped for Christ, a documentary released in 2014 about a Christian behavior modification program
 The Last Stop, a documentary on the Élan School released in 2017
 Life Boat, a short film created, written, and directed by Lorriane Nicholson and starring Stephen Dorff, released in 2017
 This Is Paris, a documentary on Paris Hilton's experience in various troubled-teen programs, released in 2020
Joe versus Elan School, a web-based graphic novel
Outer Banks (TV series): In the ninth episode of Season Three, the 17-year-old character Kiara is sent to Kitty Hawk, a wilderness therapy program where she is diagonsed with Oppositional Defiant Disorder.

Techniques
 Attack therapy
 Primal therapy
 Large-group awareness training
 Conversion therapy

References

Further reading

Juvenile delinquency
Ethically disputed business practices
Industries (economics)
Human rights abuses
Conversion therapy
Medical controversies
Religion and mental health
Religion and science